is a Japanese football player. He plays for Kataller Toyama.

Playing career
Nobuyuki Shiina joined to Matsumoto Yamaga FC in 2014. In July 2015, he moved to Kataller Toyama.

Club statistics
Updated to 23 February 2018.

References

External links
Profile at Kataller Toyama

1991 births
Living people
Ryutsu Keizai University alumni
Association football people from Hokkaido
Japanese footballers
J1 League players
J2 League players
J3 League players
Matsumoto Yamaga FC players
Kataller Toyama players
Association football midfielders
Sportspeople from Sapporo
Universiade gold medalists for Japan
Universiade medalists in football
Medalists at the 2011 Summer Universiade